Mease Countryside Hospital is a hospital in Safety Harbor, Florida.

References 
 Mease Countryside Hospital; baycare.org Access date April 16, 2011

Hospital buildings completed in 1986
Hospitals in Florida